High School Hero is a lost 1927 silent film comedy directed by David Butler and starring Nick Stuart and Sally Phipps. It was produced and distributed by Fox Film Corporation.

Cast
Nick Stuart as Pete Greer
Sally Phipps as Eleanor Barrett
William Bailey as Mr. Merrill
John Darrow as Bill Merrill
Wade Boteler as Mr. Greer
Brandon Hurst as Mr. Golden
David Rollins as Allen Drew
Charles Paddock as Coach

See also
1937 Fox vault fire

References

External links
 The High School Hero at IMDb.com

1927 films
American silent feature films
Lost American films
Fox Film films
Films directed by David Butler
American black-and-white films
1927 comedy films
Silent American comedy films
1927 lost films
Lost comedy films
1920s American films
1920s English-language films